Aixa Middleton González (born 6 February 1988) is a Panamanian track and field athlete who competes in the discus throw. She has represented her country at the Central American and Caribbean Games (2010, 2014), the South American Championships in Athletics (2013, 2015), the Ibero-American Championships in Athletics (2010, 2014) and the 2015 Pan American Games.

Middleton won her first senior medal at the 2002 Central American Championships in Athletics at the age of 14, taking the discus silver medal. She was highly successful in regional age category competitions: competing in both shot put and discus, she took four gold medals as a youth athlete at the Central American Junior and Youth Championships in Athletics before going on to win five gold medals as a junior (under-20). As a senior, she is the dominant thrower in Central America, having won eight titles Central American Championships in Athletics and taken three gold medals at the Central American Games. She is the meet record holder at both meets, with a 55 metres championship record and a  games record.

She studied at the Technological University of Panama and gained a bachelor's degree in electromechanical engineering in 2012 before gaining a post-graduate degree in business management in 2014.

International competitions

References

External links

 Aixa Middleton at the 2019 Pan American Games

1988 births
Living people
Panamanian discus throwers
Female discus throwers
Panamanian shot putters
Female shot putters
Panamanian female athletes
Pan American Games competitors for Panama
Athletes (track and field) at the 2015 Pan American Games
Athletes (track and field) at the 2019 Pan American Games
Competitors at the 2010 Central American and Caribbean Games
Competitors at the 2014 Central American and Caribbean Games
Competitors at the 2018 Central American and Caribbean Games
Central American Games gold medalists for Panama
Central American Games medalists in athletics
Central American Games silver medalists for Panama
Technological University of Panama alumni